Vaceuchelus scrobiculatus is a species of sea snail, a marine gastropod mollusc in the family Chilodontidae.

Description
The height of the shell attains 8 mm.
The imperforate, dull white shell has an ovate-conic, subventricose shape. The apex rather obtuse. The shell is ornamented with strong spiral subnodose ribs, decussated by elevated rib-striae cutting the interstices into square pits, of which there are 3 or 4 series on the third whorl, 4 on the penultimate, and 7 on the last. The five whorls are rounded and separated by a deep, subcanaliculate suture. The oblique aperture is rounded, and sub-pearly. The outer lip is duplicate. It has an acute edge. it is crenulated, and sulcate inside. The simple columella is vertical.

Distribution
This species is distributed in the Red Sea and in the Indian Ocean off Réunion; also off New Caledonia, the Loyalty Islands, Vanuatu, Fiji, the Philippines.

References

 Vine, P. (1986). Red Sea Invertebrates. Immel Publishing, London. 224 pp.
 Poppe G.T., Tagaro S.P. & Dekker H. (2006) The Seguenziidae, Chilodontidae, Trochidae, Calliostomatidae and Solariellidae of the Philippine Islands. Visaya Supplement 2: 1–228. page(s): 47
 Herbert D.G. (1996) A critical review of the trochoidean types in the Muséum d'Histoire naturelle, Bordeaux (Mollusca, Gastropoda). Bulletin du Muséum national d'Histoire naturelle, Paris, ser. 4, 18 (A, 3-4): 409–445.
 Vilvens, C. (2017). New species and new records of Chilodontidae (Gastropoda: Vetigastropoda: Seguenzioidea) from the Pacific Ocean. Novapex, Hors Série. 11: 1-67

External links
 Souverbie [S.-M. & Montrouzier [X.]. (1866). Descriptions d'espèces nouvelles de l'Archipel Calédonien. Journal de Conchyliologie. 14: 138-151, pl. 6]
 

scrobiculatus
Gastropods described in 1886